Ezekiel 39 is the thirty-ninth chapter of the Book of Ezekiel in the Hebrew Bible or the Old Testament of the Christian Bible. This book contains the prophecies attributed to the prophet/priest Ezekiel, and is one of the Books of the Prophets. The previous chapter and verses 1-16 of this chapter form a section dealing with "Gog, of the land of Magog".

Text
The original text was written in the Hebrew language. This chapter is divided into 29 verses. The New King James Version divides this chapter into the following sections:
 = Gog's Armies Destroyed
 = The Burial of Gog
 = A Triumphant Festival
 = Israel Restored to the Land

Textual witnesses
Some early manuscripts containing the text of this chapter in Hebrew are of the Masoretic Text tradition, which includes the Codex Cairensis (895), the Petersburg Codex of the Prophets (916), Aleppo Codex (10th century), Codex Leningradensis (1008).

There is also a translation into Koine Greek known as the Septuagint, made in the last few centuries BC. Extant ancient manuscripts of the Septuagint version include Codex Vaticanus (B; B; 4th century), Codex Alexandrinus (A; A; 5th century) and Codex Marchalianus (Q; Q; 6th century).

Verse 1
 "And you, son of man, prophesy against Gog, and say, ‘Thus says the Lord God: “Behold, I am against you, O Gog, the prince of Rosh, Meshech, and Tubal" (NKJV)
 "Son of man" (Hebrew: בן־אדם -): this phrase is used 93 times to address Ezekiel.
 "Rosh" (Hebrew: ראש ): can also be translated as "head" (of human and animal); "top" (of the mountain); "beginning" (of time); "river-head"; "chief" (as in "chief-prince", "chief-priest", head of the family). In conjunction to the preceding word "prince", most English Bibles translates them as "chief prince".

Verses 16-24
In these verses, Ezekiel says that God "invites the fowls of the heaven and the beasts of the earth to a great feast, a sacrificial meal which he shall slay for them". Biblical commentator Andrew B. Davidson notes that "all slaughtering of animals was a sacrificial act" in ancient times.

Verse 25
 Therefore thus says the Lord God: ‘Now I will bring back the captives of Jacob, and have mercy on the whole house of Israel; and I will be jealous for My holy name’ (NKJV)
 "Now I will bring back" (Hebrew: עתה אשיב  ): denoting restoration before the end times.

See also

Related Bible parts: Genesis 10, Psalm 83, Ezekiel 38, Revelation 20

Notes

References

Bibliography

External links

Jewish
Ezekiel 39 Hebrew with Parallel English
Ezekiel 39 Hebrew with Rashi's Commentary

Christian
Ezekiel 39 English Translation with Parallel Latin Vulgate 

39
Gog and Magog
Gyges of Lydia